Lemmermanniella is a genus of cyanobacteria belonging to the family Synechococcaceae.

The genus name of Lemmermanniella is in honour of Ernst Johann Lemmermann (1867-1915), who was a German botanist.

The genus was circumscribed by Lothar Geitler in Nat. Pflanzenfam. (Engler & Prantl) ed.2, vol.1b on page 62 in 1942.

Species:
Lemmermanniella flexa 
Lemmermanniella gracillima 
Lemmermanniella obesa 
Lemmermanniella pallida 
Lemmermanniella parva 
Lemmermanniella terrestris 
Lemmermanniella uliginosa

References

Synechococcales
Cyanobacteria genera